Tippirajapuram is a village in Kumbakonam taluk, Thanjavur district, Tamil Nadu. It is located near the banks of the river Cauvery in India. The nearest railway station is Kumbakonam which is 8 kilometres away. Vikrama Soleswarar and Varadaraja Perumal temples are located in the village.

Demographics 

In the 2001 census, Tippirajapurm had a population of 3560 with 1796 males and 1764 females. The sex ratio was 982 and the literacy rate, 76.4.

References 

 

Villages in Thanjavur district